Heliconiophaga is a genus of parasitic flies in the family Tachinidae.

Species
Heliconiophaga cranei Thompson, 1966

Distribution
Trinidad and Tobago.

References

Monotypic Brachycera genera
Endemic fauna of Trinidad and Tobago
Diptera of North America
Exoristinae
Tachinidae genera